The Denver Daredevils were a professional roller hockey team based in Denver, Colorado, United States that played in Roller Hockey International. The Daredevils played in the Roller Hockey International in 1996. Coached by Kevin Cheveldayoff in their only season, they played 28 games: eight of which they won, 17 of which they lost, and three of which they lost in overtime.

References 

Roller Hockey International teams
Sports clubs established in 1996
Sports teams in Denver
Sports clubs disestablished in 1996
1996 establishments in Colorado
1996 disestablishments in Colorado
Defunct sports teams in Colorado